Rotulidae is a family of small sand dollars native to the Atlantic coast of Africa, with 3 genera, with Rotula and Heliophora being extant, the other, Rotuloidea, being extinct since the Pliocene, but all three being found in the fossil record along the Atlantic African coast since the Miocene.

Morphology
The generalized rotulid has a circular to oval-shaped test, and indentations starting along the posterior edge.  In Heliophora, the indentations may remain restricted to the posterior edge, or they may reach to the anterior edges of the test.  Depending on the individual, the indentations may be very shallow, or very deep, forming very long "fingers," or digits. While rotulids are very distinctive in appearance, they are also highly morphic, with a tremendous diversity seen in individual specimens.  That the digits are very fragile, and prone to breaking off and regenerating only adds to individual variations.

In the genus Heliophora, the test is extremely variable.  Depending on the individual, indentations may be shallow or deep, and may be restricted to the posterior edge, or may be found along the entire margin of the test.

In the genus Rotula, the test has up to eleven indentations along the posterior edge, forming up to twelve digits.  The primary way to distinguish Rotula from Heliophora is that adult specimens of Rotula have up to four holes, or lunules, set into the anterior portion of the test.

In the extinct genus Rotuloidea, the test is oval-shaped, and comes to a blunt point at the anterior end of the test.  There are nine, very shallow indentations along the posterior edge of the test.  The tests of this genus are extremely similar to those of Heliophora, especially of young specimens, sometimes to the point of confusion.

Ecology and Feeding
The two living genera, Rotula and Heliophora, live in very shallow water of lagoons and estuaries, usually lightly buried in mud.  As with many sand dollars, both live in large groups.

Food particles are picked out of the substrate by the tube feet, and are maneuvered into the food grooves along the oral side of the test, which are underneath the digits of the test.  Once placed into a food groove, food particles are caught in a string of mucus and moved into the mouth, which is located in the very center of the oral side of the test.

List of genera 
According to WRMS :
 genus Fibulariella Mortensen, 1948b
 Fibulariella acuta (Yoshiwara, 1898)
 Fibulariella angulipora (Mortensen, 1948)
 Fibulariella oblonga (Gray, 1851)
 Fibulariella volva (L. Agassiz in L. Agassiz & Desor, 1847a)
 genus Heliophora L. Agassiz, 1840a
 Heliophora orbiculus (Linnaeus, 1758)
 genus Rotula Schumacher, 1817
 Rotula deciesdigitatus (Leske, 1778)
 genus Rotuloidea Etheridge, 1872 †
 Rotuloidea fimbriata Etheridge, 1872 †
 Rotuloidea vieirai Dartevelle, 1953b †

References
 Schultz, Heinke' (2006) Sea Urchins I: a guide to worldwide shallow water species Heinke + Peter Schultz Partner Scientific Publications ; 
 Treatise on Invertebrate Paleontology Part U, Volume 2 1966

Clypeasteroida
Extant Tortonian first appearances